The British Rail Class 745 FLIRT is a class of electric multiple unit passenger train, built by Stadler as part of the FLIRT family. The class is built for Greater Anglia for use on their inter-city services and the Stansted Express services. They first entered service on 8 January 2020, after being constructed between 2018 and 2020 in Switzerland.

History
In August 2016, Abellio Greater Anglia was awarded the East Anglia franchise with a commitment to replace all of the existing fleet. As part of this, an order was placed with Stadler Rail for twenty 12-carriage electric multiple units that would join the FLIRT family. These new trains are classified as Class 745s and are divided into two sub-classes: ten 745/0 units and ten 745/1 units. Alongside the related Class 755 units, also in the FLIRT family, the units will be maintained at Crown Point TMD.

The 745/0 units were built to replace the Class 90 locomotive, Mark 3 carriage and Driving Van Trailer loco-hauled sets on the inter-city London Liverpool Street to Norwich services, which they have now fully done. The 745/1 units were built to replace the Class 379 fleet used on Stansted Express services. 

The interiors of the units feature USB and plug points, air conditioning, free WiFi, passenger information screens, larger accessible areas, bicycle storage areas and include digital seat reservation displays. All trains have a low floor making the train more accessible for wheelchairs and pushchairs. In comparison with the 745/1 units, the 745/0 units include First Class accommodation, tables and a bistro. A trolley service also operates on certain trains.

Operation 

The trains were first approved for passenger service in July 2019 and were expected to enter passenger service in late 2019. However, there was a delay in this as they were still missing their passenger information systems around the time they were due to enter service, which resulted in Greater Anglia having to seek derogation to operate the Class 90 + Mark 3 sets into 2020. 

Following this, the first 745/0 unit finally entered service on 8 January 2020 on the Norwich to Liverpool Street route and, as of late March 2020, have now fully replaced the loco-hauled fleet.

The first Class 745/1 unit entered service on 30 March 2020 and these are also being used on the Norwich to Liverpool Street route, with the first service on the Stansted Express starting on 28 July 2020.

As of December 2020, all twenty of the Class 745 units have entered service.

Technical details
Class 745 units of both subclasses are formed of 12 vehicles, which are grouped in pairs that share an unpowered Jacobs bogie. Conventional semi-permanent couplings join each pair of vehicles together, a difference from other FLIRT models (that use Jacobs bogies throughout) necessary in order to provide energy absorption should a collision or derailment occur. Traction motors are carried on four bogies in each unit; one under each driver's cab and one either side of the centremost coupling. Pantographs are fitted to the second and eleventh vehicles in each unit.

Fleet details

See also

  – A similar class of bi-mode multiple units also built by Stadler Rail for Greater Anglia.

References

External links
New Trains section of Greater Anglia Website

Stadler Rail multiple units
Train-related introductions in 2020
25 kV AC multiple units